Tuba, officially the Municipality of Tuba, , is a 1st class municipality in the province of Benguet, Philippines. According to the 2020 census, it has a population of 48,312 people.

Tuba is known as the "Gateway to Baguio", as the Asin–Nangalisan–San Pascual Road, Ben Palispis Highway or Marcos Highway, Kennon Road and Naguilian Road, four access highways of the adjacent city of Baguio, traverse the municipality.

History
Tuba was originally a barrio of the township of Baguio in the early 1900s under the American Occupation of the Philippines.
It was separated from Baguio upon the latter's conversion into a chartered city on September 1, 1909, and became part of the township of Twin Peaks in Benguet.

Twin Peaks was abolished as a township on December 11, 1911, with the issuance of Executive Order No. 77 by American Governor General William Cameron Forbes, creating the township of Tuba.

On June 25, 1963, President Diosdado Macapagal issued Executive Order No. 42 and by operation of Section 2 of Republic Act No. 1515, the municipal District of Tuba was converted into a regular municipality.

Geography

Tuba is at the south-western tip of both Benguet and the Central Cordillera Mountain Range. South of the municipality lies the province of Pangasinan and to the west lies the Ilocos rolling hills of the province of La Union. It is bordered on the north by Sablan and La Trinidad; east by Baguio and Itogon; and south by Sison and San Manuel.

According to the Philippine Statistics Authority, the municipality has a land area of  constituting  of the  total area of Benguet.

Topography
Tuba's topography is generally characterized by irregular rugged terrain and steep slopes with several mountain peaks rising from the table land itself.

Four major rivers/streams and 49 tributary/minor rivers and creeks intersect the landform and serve as the drains of the municipality.

Barangays
Tuba is politically subdivided into 13 barangays. These barangays are headed by elected officials: Barangay Captain, Barangay Council, whose members are called Barangay Councilors. All are elected every three years.

Climate

Tuba has 2 pronounced seasons - wet and dry. The dry season starts in November and lasts until April while the wet season lasts from May to October.

Demographics

In the 2020 census, Tuba had a population of 48,312.

Economy 

Mining is a major contributor to the economy of Tuba. The town's mining industry began upon the discovery of gold in the province of Benguet during the early 1930s. Since 1958, Philex Mining Corporation, the largest gold and copper producer in the Philippines, has been operating the first underground block cave mine in the Far East at Padcal in Barangay Camp 3.

A few abandoned mining sites such as those of Benguet Exploration Mine and Black Mountain, Inc. have been left unattended for years, which pose a threat to the local population and the environment.

The presence of waterfalls, hot springs and natural caves in the municipality boosts tourism.
Mount Cabuyao and Mount Santo Tomas, the highest mountain in the town, are frequently visited by mountaineers.

Government
Tuba, belonging to the lone congressional district of the province of Benguet, is governed by a mayor designated as its local chief executive and by a municipal council as its legislative body in accordance with the Local Government Code. The mayor, vice mayor, and the councilors are elected directly by the people through an election which is being held every three years.

Elected officials

Transportation

The four major highways that connect the lowlands to Baguio pass through the municipality.

Education

Public schools
As of 2014, Tuba has 32 public elementary schools and 6 public secondary schools.

Gallery

Notes

References

External links

 [ Philippine Standard Geographic Code]

Municipalities of Benguet
Mining communities in the Philippines